Kenneth Lionel Fry (8 November 192010 October 2007) was a Member of the Australian House of Representatives representing Fraser, Australian Capital Territory for the Australian Labor Party, from 1974 to 1984.

Early years
Fry was born in Inverell, New South Wales, the youngest of seven children, and spent many of his early years around Bathurst. He completed a diploma at the Hawkesbury Agricultural College in 1938.  During World War II, he served in the Second Australian Imperial Force from 1939 to 1945, including service in New Guinea, Borneo and South East Asia.  He married Audrey Clibbens in 1946 and then worked in business and farming in the Bathurst district from 1947 to 1967. He joined the Australian Public Service in 1968 as an agricultural officer.  He completed a BA at the Australian National University (ANU) in 1973 and a BLitt in 1981.

Political career
Fry was a member of the Australian Capital Territory Advisory Council from 1970 to 1974. In 1973, he was elected as the first president of the Australian Capital Territory branch of the Labor Party. In 1974 he was elected as the first member for Fraser. From 1975, he became particularly involved in the campaign for the independence of East Timor. Subsequently, Fry addressed three international bodies on this issue: the UN Security Council in April 1976, the international conference on East Timor in Lisbon in May 1979 and the Permanent Peoples Tribunal hearing on East Timor in Lisbon in 1981. Fry retired from politics in 1984.

Life after politics
After retiring from Parliament, Fry returned initially to study, completing his PhD in Australian history under the guidance of Professor Manning Clark at ANU. Fry and his wife later retired to the South Coast of New South Wales.

References

1920 births
2007 deaths
Australian Labor Party members of the Parliament of Australia
Members of the Australian House of Representatives for Fraser (ACT)
Members of the Australian House of Representatives
20th-century Australian politicians
Australian Army personnel of World War II